SFM may refer to:

In entertainment:
SFM Holiday Network, a defunct "occasional" U.S. television network
"Sing for Me" (Christina Aguilera song), also released by Ginny Blackmore with the title "SFM"

In organizations:
SFM Entertainment, a television distribution company
Scuderia Ferrari, the racing division of the Ferrari automobile company, formerly known as Scuderia Ferrari Marlboro
Seaside FM, a radio station in East Yorkshire, UK
Serveis Ferroviaris de Mallorca, a railway operating on the Spanish island of Majorca
Società per le Strade Ferrate Meridionali, an Italian railway company of the 19th century

In places:
Sanford Seacoast Regional Airport (IATA code), in Sanford, Maine
Science Fiction Museum and Hall of Fame, formerly part of what is now the EMP Museum in Seattle, Washington

In science and technology:
Sales force management (likewise Sales drive management), it-method for business; also SFM system (likewise Sales Force Automation)
SFMBT1 or "scm-like with four MBT domains 1", a gene
Scanning force microscopy or atomic force microscopy, a very high-resolution type of scanning probe microscopy
Shoulder-fired missile
Source Filmmaker, video capture and editing software
Spectral flatness measurement, used in digital audio signal processing
Structure from motion, a process used in computer vision
Surface feet per minute, a unit of velocity used in machining to identify the machinability ratings of a material
Sustainable forest management, the management of forests according to the principles of sustainable development

In other uses:
SFM Junak, a brand of Polish motorcycles
ŠK Senec, formerly known as ŠK SFM Senec, a Slovak soccer club
SFM is the ticker symbol for the cryptocurrency SafeMoon.

See also
SFMA (disambiguation)